St. Augustine Church is a former Catholic church at the southeast corner of 6th and Main Streets in Dallas, South Dakota. It currently houses the Gregory County History Museum, operated by the Gregory County Historical Society.

The church was built in 1925 and was added to the National Register of Historic Places in 2009.

References

Churches on the National Register of Historic Places in South Dakota
Romanesque Revival church buildings in South Dakota
Roman Catholic churches completed in 1925
Churches in Gregory County, South Dakota
Former Roman Catholic church buildings in South Dakota
National Register of Historic Places in Gregory County, South Dakota
20th-century Roman Catholic church buildings in the United States